John Kabaireho (1923 or 1924 – January 22, 2014) was a Ugandan politician. He was the Prime Minister of dependent Ankole Kingdom from 1960 to 1963. In 1963 he was replaced by James Kahigiriza.

References

1920s births
2014 deaths
Ugandan politicians